Laura Cox is an American politician from Michigan. Cox is a former Republican member of Michigan House of Representatives, and the former Chairwoman of the Michigan Republican Party.

Education
Cox has undergraduate degree in Criminal Justice, and a master's degree in Criminal Justice Research and Planning from Michigan State University.

Career 
Cox was a United States Customs Service special agent for 13 years.

In 2004, Cox was first elected to the Wayne County Commission, where she served until 2014. Cox chaired the Ways and Means Committee. Cox has been the 11th Congressional District chairperson, treasurer to the Wayne 11th Congressional District Republican Committee, and on the Michigan Republican State Committee as a member of the Policy Committee, Women for Bush 2008 Co-Chair, and as a delegate at-large to the 2012 Republican National Convention.

On November 4, 2014, Cox won the election and became a Republican member of the Michigan House of Representatives for District 19. Cox defeated Stacey Dogonski with 61.77% of the votes. On November 8, 2016, as an incumbent, Cox won the election and continued serving District 19. Cox defeated Steve King with 61.42% of the votes.

On November 6, 2018, Cox ran for the Michigan Senate seat for District 7 but lost the election. Cox received 47.33% of the votes and she was defeated by Dayna Polehanki with 50.56% of the votes.

In 2018, Cox was endorsed for State GOP Chair by campaign manager Brad Parscale. On February 23, 2019, Cox was named the chair person of Michigan Republican Party. Cox's co-chair is Terry Bowman.

2020 presidential election 
After Joe Biden won the 2020 presidential election and President Donald Trump refused to concede and made baseless claims of fraud, Cox called for delaying the certification of election results in Michigan. Her complaints about the election results focused solely on Wayne County, which includes Detroit, majority-black city. Cox falsely claimed that Republican poll watchers were prevented from observing the ballot counting in Detroit; in fact, more than 134 Republican poll watchers in the TCF Center in Detroit, where ballots were counted. Politico described Cox's comments on Republican poll watchers as egregiously dishonest.

Personal life 
Cox's husband is Mike Cox, former Attorney General of Michigan. They have four children. Cox and her family live in Livonia, Michigan.

See also 
 2014 Michigan House of Representatives election
 2016 Michigan House of Representatives election

References

External links
 
 Laura Cox at ballotpedia.org

1964 births
21st-century American politicians
21st-century American women politicians
County commissioners in Michigan
Living people
Republican Party members of the Michigan House of Representatives
Michigan Republican Party chairs
Michigan State University alumni
People from Livonia, Michigan
United States Customs Service personnel
Women state legislators in Michigan